The Redemption of a Pal is a 1914 American silent drama short directed by Henry Otto starring Edith Borella, Charlotte Burton,  George Field, Winifred Greenwood and Edward Coxen.

External links

American black-and-white films
American silent short films
1914 drama films
1914 films
Films directed by Henry Otto
1914 short films
Silent American drama films
1910s American films
American drama short films
1910s English-language films